Álvaro Mantilla Pérez (born 9 May 2000) is a Spanish footballer who plays for Racing de Santander. Mainly a central defender, he can also play as a right back.

Club career
Born in Maliaño, Camargo, Cantabria, Mantilla joined Racing de Santander's youth setup in 2015, from Club Bansander. On 2 August 2019, after finishing his formation, he was loaned to Tercera División side CD Laredo for the season.

Mantilla made his senior debut on 14 September 2019, starting in a 3–0 home win over UD Sámano. He scored his first goal as a senior the following 18 July, netting the opener in a 3–1 home success over CD Tropezón which helped his side to reach the finals of the play-offs; the club ultimately achieved promotion to Segunda División B after 30 years.

Back to Racing for the 2020–21 season, Mantilla became a part of the first team squad also in the third division, being regularly used. On 20 March 2022, he renewed his contract until 2024, and was mainly a backup to Pol Moreno and Pablo Bobadilla as his side achieved promotion to Segunda División.

Mantilla made his professional debut on 11 September 2022, starting in a 2–0 away win over Sporting de Gijón.

References

External links

2000 births
Living people
People from Camargo, Cantabria
Spanish footballers
Footballers from Cantabria
Association football defenders
Segunda División players
Primera Federación players
Segunda División B players
Tercera División players
Racing de Santander players